The Roseg Glacier (Romansh: Vadret da Roseg) is a 4 km long glacier (2005) situated in the Bernina Range, in the Val Roseg (Graubünden). In 1973 it had an area of 8.52 km2.

See also
List of glaciers in Switzerland
List of glaciers
Retreat of glaciers since 1850
Swiss Alps

References

External links
Swiss glacier monitoring network

Glaciers of Graubünden
Glaciers of the Alps
Ramsar sites in Switzerland